Olanchery Rajagopal (born 15 September 1929) is an Indian politician, former Union Minister of State,  and the former MLA from Nemom and the first  Bharatiya Janata Party member & BJP's floor leader in the Legislative Assembly of Kerala. One of the major leaders of the Bharatiya Janata Party from Kerala, he has held various ministerial portfolios including Defence, Parliamentary Affairs, Urban Development, Law, Justice, Company Affairs, and Railways. Rajagopal was a two-time MP in Rajya Sabha, the upper house of Indian Parliament from 1992 till 2004. O.Rajagopal was also a member of Government of Kerala's Legislative Assembly Committee on Petitions & Committee of Public Work, Transport and Communications.

In addition, he was the first BJP Central Minister from Kerala and also served as the BJP parliamentary party deputy leader in the Rajya Sabha. Rajagopal was also the former BJP national vice president & state president of BJP in Kerala. Rajagopal lost the 2014 Loksabha elections in the Thiruvananthapuram constituency by a narrow margin of 13000 votes after a close fight. He has also lost few assembly elections by a low margin .

Union Government planned to make O. Rajagopal the next State Governor of Goa after his term ended as an MLA in the Kerala Legislative Assembly in May 2021 . But he gave away the offer later by Central govt. that allows another Kerala BJP leader PS Sreedharan Pillai who is then Governor of Mizoram and transferred to Goa as the new Governor.

Early life
He was born on 15 September 1929 to Pandalam Kunnathu Madhavan Nair and O. Konhikkavu Amma of Olanchery Veedu in Pudukkode Panchayath in Palakkad. He is the eldest of the six children born to his parents. His early education took place in Kanakkannoor elementary school and Manjapra Upper Primary school and later went to Government Victoria College, Palakkad.

His Law education was undertaken in Madras and after he completed his studies in law, he began practicing law in 1956 at the Palakkad District Court.

Jana Sangh work
He was inspired by Deendayal Upadhyaya and began working in the Bharatiya Jana Sangh, shortly after completing his studies. The death of Upadhyaya in 1968 spurred Rajagopal to pursue his public career more deeply. He was the State General Secretary of Jana Sangh until 1974. That same year, he was promoted to the post of President, a post he held until 1977.

During the Emergency period he was jailed with V. Velankutty, who was the Palakkad District President of Jana Sangh in Viyyur Central Jail. After the Indian Emergency, the Jana Sangh merged with the Janata Party. During this period of time Rajagopal served as the State General Secretary for the Jana Sangh.

BJP work
In 1980, the Janata Party split and the Bharatiya Janata Party (BJP) was formed. Rajagopal then served as its Kerala president until 1985. After 1985 he occupied a number of positions, including the All India Secretary, General Secretary, and the Vice-President of BJP. In 1989 he ran for a Lok Sabha from Manjeri but lost. Two years later, he contested in Thiruvananthapuram seat and lost again. His next run took place in the state of Madhya Pradesh. He was elected in 1992 and 1998 to the Rajya Sabha. In 1999 he attempted a second run from Thiruvananthapuram but failed again. However, he got a total of 1,58,221 votes (20.9%) and came second in one assembly segment out of seven. The total number of votes he secured was much higher than that for the previous BJP candidate in 1998 (94,303 votes, 12.3%)  and 1996 (74,904, 10.4%) Lok Sabha elections.

In 2004 Lok Sabha election, he contested for the third time from Thiruvananthapuram and finished third yet again, behind INC candidate V. S Shivakumar and CPI candidate P. K. Vasudevan Nair. He secured a total of 2,28,052 votes (29.9%) which was the highest votes secured by a BJP candidate in Kerala.

In the 2011 Assembly elections he contested from the Nemom constituency in Thiruvananthapuram, but eventually lost by a margin of 6,400 votes. He lost the by-election from Neyyattinkara, which was held on 2 June 2012. However, he increased the BJP votes from 6,730 (2011 Assembly Election) to 30,507; an almost five-fold increase within a span of a year. The BJP vote share also significantly increased from 6.0% in the 2011 election to 23.2%. He contested from Thiruvananthapuram for the fourth time in 2014 and finished second position, behind INC candidate Shashi Tharoor who was former UPA Minister at the central government. Rajagopal secured a total of 2,82,336 votes (32.3%) and lost by a margin of 15,470 votes (1.8%) against Tharoor, who had secured 2,97,806 votes.

He contested in Aruvikkara by-election and finished third, although his personal influence ensured that in the contest BJP increased votes from 7,694 to 34,145 causing division of anti-incumbency vote resulting in the victory of UDF.
In the 2016 Assembly elections he contested from Nemom and defeated the sitting MLA V. Sivankutty, by a margin of 8,671 votes, thereby entering Kerala Legislative Assembly for the first time at the age of 87.

Lok Sabha Elections

2014 Lok Sabha Election

2004 Lok Sabha Election

1999 Lok Sabha Election

Kerala Assembly Elections

Assembly election 2016

Aruvikkara by-election 2015

Neyyattinkara By-Election 2012

Assembly election 2011

Assembly election 2006

Assembly election 1970

References

1929 births
Living people
Rajya Sabha members from Madhya Pradesh
National Democratic Alliance candidates in the 2014 Indian general election
Government Victoria College, Palakkad alumni
Bharatiya Jana Sangh politicians
Indians imprisoned during the Emergency (India)
Hindu revivalists
Activists from Kerala
People from Palakkad district
Kerala MLAs 2016–2021
Malayali politicians
Kerala politicians
Bharatiya Janata Party politicians from Kerala